Casasia haitensis is a species of plant that is native to Haiti. It belongs to the family Rubiaceae.

References

haitensis